Murder the Dance is the second studio album by American metal band Bleed the Sky. It was released on June 10, 2008 in the United States through Nuclear Blast Records and on June 13 in Europe through Massacre Records. It features a total of 13 tracks, one of which being hidden.

The album was originally scheduled to be released by the end of 2007 and was finished recording by July of that same year. Due to internal issues within the band, its release was delayed. Bleed the Sky acquired new guitarist Justin Warrick who helped finish the recording of the album. The album was completed as of January 2008.

Track listing 
 "Knife Fight in a Phone Booth" – 3:41
 "Sullivan" – 3:54
 "Murder the Dance" – 4:16
 "The Sleeping Beauty" – 4:25
 "Morose" – 5:27
 "Occam's Razor" – 4:04
 "Bastion" – 4:14
 "Slavior" – 4:40
 "Kettle Black" – 3:23
 "Poseidon" – 4:20
 "The Demons That Could Be" – 3:49
 "Vertical Smile" – 17:35

Personnel 
 Noah Robinson – vocals
 Rob Thornton – guitar
 Justin Warrick – guitar
 Ryan Clark – bass
 Austin D'Amond – drums
 Wayne Miller – writing credit on "The Demons That Could Be" but did not record
 Sons of Nero – artwork

References 

2008 albums
Bleed the Sky (band) albums
Massacre Records albums
Nuclear Blast albums
Albums with cover art by Sons of Nero